Crveni Bregovi is a village in the municipality of Negotino, North Macedonia. It is located in the Povardarie wine-growing region, along the river Vardar.

Demographics
As of the 2021 census, Crveni Bregovi had 182 residents with the following ethnic composition:
Others (including Torbeš) 85 
Macedonians 60
Persons for whom data are taken from administrative sources 22
Turks 9
Albanians 5
Roma 1

According to the 2002 census, the village had a total of 170 inhabitants. Ethnic groups in the village include:
Macedonians 90
Romani 34
Albanians 27
Turks 17
Serbs 2

References

Villages in Negotino Municipality
Albanian communities in North Macedonia